1st Mini Album is the debut mini-album by South Korean singer Taegoon produced by Crown J.

Singles
"Call Me" was the first single to be released from the album.  The debut performance was on MBC's show Music Core on January 17, 2009. The video for the song featured Park Shin-hye and TVXQ's Hero Jaejoong.

Track listing
 Intro
 Call Me (Feat. Park Shin Hye and Kim Jaejoong)
 One Two Step
 My Girl
 난 그녈 알아 (Feat. H-유진) ("I Understand You")
 Hands Up

External links
 1st Mini Album on Pony Canyon Korea

2009 debut EPs
Korean-language EPs
Taegoon EPs
Pony Canyon EPs